The 2009 McDonald's All-American Girls Game was an All-star basketball game played on Wednesday, April 1, 2009 at the BankUnited Center in Miami, Florida, home of the University of Miami Hurricanes. The game's rosters featured the best and most highly recruited high school girls graduating in 2009.  The game was the 8th annual version of the McDonald's All-American Game first played in 2002.

The 48 players were selected from 2,500 nominees by a committee of basketball experts. They were chosen not only for their on-court skills, but for their performances off the court as well. Coach Morgan Wootten, who had more than 1,200 wins as head basketball coach at DeMatha High School, was chairman of the selection committee. Legendary UCLA coach John Wooden, who has been involved in the McDonald's All American Games since its inception, served as chairman of the Games and as an advisor to the selection committee.

Proceeds from the 2009 McDonald's All American High School Basketball Games went to Ronald McDonald House Charities (RMHC) of South Florida and its Ronald McDonald House program.

2009 Game
The game was telecast live by ESPN.  The West Team grabbed a hard-fought 69-68 victory in the opener at the BankUnited Center. The contest was close throughout and came down to a missed free throw with
seconds remaining. Kelly Faris (Connecticut) was fouled as she was forced to take a desperation 3-pointer with two seconds to go.  After nailing the first two shots, the third came up short and so did the frantic comeback of the East Team.

In a game that was dominated by defense, the West Squad managed to get double figure scoring from only five players. Taber Spani (Tennessee), Christina Marinacci (USC) and DeNesha Stallworth (California) led the offensive attack with 11 points each, while Gennifer Brandon (California) added 10. Tierra Ruffin-Pratt (North Carolina) poured in 10 points and grabbed a team high 10 rebounds.

The East Team was led by Skylar Diggins (Notre Dame), who scored 18 points, grabbed five rebounds and nabbed three steals. Morgan Wootten Player of the Year Kelsey Bone (South Carolina) and TaShauna Rodgers (Georgetown) contributed with 10 points and five rebounds each. Kelly Faris provided an all-around solid performance, as she paced the East in rebounds with seven, added four points, three steals, three assists and two blocks in just 15 minutes of play.

For their efforts, Skylar Diggins and Tierra Ruffin-Pratt were selected as the John R.  Wooden MVP’s of the game. Unable to play due to injury, Stephanie Holzer (Vanderbilt) was given the Naismith Sportsmanship Award for her involvement in the week’s events and for the support she displayed towards her fellow All Americans.

2009 West Roster

2009 East Roster

Coaches
The West team was coached by:
 Head Coach Dave Power of Fenwick High School (Oak Park, IL)
 Asst Coach Dale Heidloff of Fenwick High School (Oak Park, IL)
 Asst Coach Derril Kipp of Maine West High School (Des Plaines, IL)

The East team was coached by:
 Head Coach Abby Ward of South Broward High School (Hollywood, FL)
 Asst Coach Jermaine Hollis of South Broward High School (Hollywood, FL)
 Asst Coach Patricia James of Boyd H. Anderson High School (Lauderdale Lakes, FL)

Boxscore

Visitors: West

Home: East

(* = Starting Line-up)

All-American Week

Schedule

 Tuesday, March 31: Powerade JamFest
 Three-Point Shoot-out
 Timed Basketball Skills Competition
 Wednesday, April 1: 8th Annual Girls All-American Game

The Powerade JamFest is a skills-competition evening featuring basketball players who demonstrate their skills in two crowd-entertaining ways.  Since the first All-American game in 2002, players have competed in a 3-point shooting challenge and a timed basketball skills competition.

Contest Winners
 The 2009 Timed Skills Competition contest was won by China Crosby.
 Skylar Diggins was winner of the 2009 3-point shoot-out.

See also
 2009 McDonald's All-American Boys Game

References

External links
McDonald's All-American on the web

2009 in American women's basketball
2009